A Spy in the House of Love is a 1954 novel by Anaïs Nin. Alongside her other novels, Ladders to Fire, Children of the Albatross, The Four-Chambered Heart and Seduction of the Minotaur, it was gathered into a collection known as Cities of the Interior. The novel follows the character of Sabina, a woman who enjoys the sexual licence typically associated with men. Sabina wears extravagant outfits and deliberately avoids romantic commitments. She pursues sexual pleasure in isolation of any other romantic attachment.

Plot summary

In 1950s New York, protagonist, Sabina, pursues her sexual desires. She calls a random number from a bar in the middle of the night, seeking to confess or find solace in the voice of a stranger. The stranger happens to be a lie detector who proceeds to follow Sabina in her activities throughout the novel. Her various love interests and her relationship with her husband, Alan, without whom she feels she cannot live, make her life more and more complex. The level of deceit her hedonistic lifestyle forces her to maintain leads her to regard herself as "an international spy in the house of love".

Reception
In a brief review, John L. Bradley referred to the novel as "Tentative, experimental, complex [...] a commendable effort to explore new frontiers of the modern novel."

Cultural references

The British band The House of Love is named after the novel and later named a compilation album after it too.
In The Simpsons episode "Half-Decent Proposal", Moe Szyslak refers to Artie Ziff by saying, "He's like a spy in the house of Moe."
The TV series Dollhouse uses the phrase as the title of its ninth episode.
French Fashion Designer, Olympia Le-Tan, creates clutches using covers of classical literature and used "A Spy in the House of Love" for her latest collection.
 Just Shoot Me episode "A Spy in the House of Me" references the title of the book.
Songs
Steve Winwood recorded a song called "Spy in the House of Love" in his 1997 album “Junction Seven“.
The American band The dB's also recorded a song titled "A Spy in the House of Love" on their album Like This.
The phrase was used as a lyric in The Doors' song "The Spy" on the album Morrison Hotel.
"Spy in the House of Love" is also the title of a song by the band Was (Not Was) released in 1987.
The band Animal Logic also released a single entitled "There's A Spy (in the House of Love)."
The phrase was used as a lyric in Anaïs Mitchell's song "Namesake" on the album The Brightness.
Carly Simon quotes a line from the book "I am an international spy in the House of Love", in her 1979 album Spy.
 Ruby Throat reference the title of the book in their song "A Spy in the House of Thieves" on their album The Ventriloquist.
 Lush song COVERT written by Miki Berenyi was inspired by the book and ends with the line "I am the spy"

References

External links

Ohio University Press page about Spy in the House of Love

Novels by Anaïs Nin
1954 American novels
1954 French novels
American erotic novels
Adultery in novels
Women's erotica and pornography
Swallow Press books